Claude Duval is a 1924 British silent adventure film directed by George A. Cooper and starring Nigel Barrie, Fay Compton and Hugh Miller. It is based on the historical story of Claude Duval.

Plot
In the seventeenth century a young Frenchman arrives in Britain and becomes mixed up in intrigue and ends up as a highwaymen.

Cast
 Nigel Barrie as Claude Duval 
 Fay Compton as Duchess Frances 
 Hugh Miller as Lord Lionel Malyn 
 A.B. Imeson as Lord Chesterton 
 Dorinea Shirley - Moll Crisp 
 James Knight as Captain Craddock 
 James Lindsay as Duke of Brentleigh 
 Betty Faire as Lady Anne 
 Charles Ashton as Tom Crisp 
 Tom Coventry as Mr Crisp 
 Stella St. Audrie as Mrs Crisp

References

External links

full Claude Duval film poster

1924 films
British historical adventure films
British silent feature films
1920s historical adventure films
Films directed by George A. Cooper
Gainsborough Pictures films
Films shot at Lime Grove Studios
Films set in England
Films set in the 1660s
Films set in the 1670s
British black-and-white films
1920s English-language films
1920s British films
Silent historical adventure films